Grzegorz Pilarz (born February 12, 1980) is a Polish volleyball player, Polish club BBTS Bielsko-Biała, Polish Champion (2004).

Career

Clubs
In 2014 moved to BBTS Bielsko-Biała, where he is a captain of team.

Sporting achievements

Clubs

CEV Cup

  2010/2011 - with ZAKSA Kędzierzyn-Koźle

National championship
 2003/2004  Polish Championship, with Jastrzębski Węgiel
 2010/2011  Polish Championship, with ZAKSA Kędzierzyn-Koźle
 2011/2012  Polish Championship, with ZAKSA Kędzierzyn-Koźle
 2012/2013  Polish Cup, with ZAKSA Kędzierzyn-Koźle
 2012/2013  Polish Championship, with ZAKSA Kędzierzyn-Koźle
 2013/2014  Polish Cup, with ZAKSA Kędzierzyn-Koźle

References

External links
 PlusLiga player profile

1980 births
Living people
Sportspeople from Bielsko-Biała
Polish men's volleyball players
Jastrzębski Węgiel players
Resovia (volleyball) players
ZAKSA Kędzierzyn-Koźle players
BBTS Bielsko-Biała players